Tin Fu Court is a Home Ownership Scheme court developed by the Hong Kong Housing Authority in Tin Shui Wai, New Territories, Hong Kong, near Tin Yan Estate, Tin Yat Estate, Tin Yuet Estate, Light Rail Tin Fu stop and Tin Sau Road Park. It comprises 16 residential blocks completed in 2001 and 2007 respectively.

History

Short piling scandal
In 1999, the piles of Block J (Chui Fu House) were found to be shortened by up to seven meters compared with the standard requirement. Foundation strengthening works was then carried out in the block and completed in 2002. It was resold to the public in 2007.

Houses

Demographics
According to the 2016 by-census, Tin Fu Court had a population of 14,766. The median age was 40.8 and the majority of residents (96.7 per cent) were of Chinese ethnicity. The average household size was 3 people. The median monthly household income of all households (i.e. including both economically active and inactive households) was HK$28,000.

Politics
Tin Fu Court is located in Fu Yan constituency of the Yuen Long District Council. It was formerly represented by Kwan Chun-sang, who was elected in the 2019 elections until July 2021.

See also

Public housing estates in Tin Shui Wai
List of Home Ownership Scheme Courts in Hong Kong

References

Tin Shui Wai
Home Ownership Scheme
Residential buildings completed in 2001
Residential buildings completed in 2007